Ellen Vaughan Kirk Grayson (September 14, 1894 – February 8, 1995) was a Canadian artist and educator. She was born in Moose Jaw, Saskatchewan but her time spent hiking in the Canadian Rockies and the Okanagan Valley has shaped her artistic style.

Family life 
The daughter of Adela and John Hawke Grayson, Grayson was born on the family farm near Moose Jaw. She began painting as a young girl, and was given lessons by a local artist named Gertrude Rorason. After she married Arthur J. Mann in 1929, she moved to Summerland, British Columbia. Grayson moved back to Moose Jaw in 1961 and later died there at the age of 100.

Work and education 
After completing high school, she travelled in Europe, Africa and South America with her cousin Ethel, attending schools in Budapest and London. She continued her education at St. Margaret's College in Toronto, at the Curry School of Expression in Massachusetts, and at Columbia University, where she obtained a Bachelor of Science. She worked as an advisor for the Moose Jaw school board and as an art instructor at teachers' colleges in Regina and Moose Jaw. Grayson also published art appreciation textbooks for elementary and secondary school students. She taught at the University of British Columbia, at the Summer School of Fine Arts in Penticton and at the Banff School of Fine Arts. After Arthur's death, she travelled to Japan, New Zealand, and Mexico to further pursue her art. In Mexico, at the Instituto Allende in San Miguel de Allende, she studied with artist Fred Samuelson.

Artwork 
Grayson painted in the impressionist style. Her work appeared in exhibitions in the United States and Canada and is included in the collections of the Art Gallery of Hamilton and the Moose Jaw Museum & Art Gallery. She painted in oil and watercolours and also produced silk screen prints. In 1942, her work was included in British Columbia's Annual Exhibition.

Writing 
She also composed a manuscript entitled Adventures of an Artist in the Canadian Rockies that was published posthumously. The work is made up of her experiences hiking and sketching in the Rocky Mountains.

Group exhibitions
 1930s Penticton Museum, Kelowna Public Library, and Vernon Public Library
 1940 Canadian National Exhibition, Contemporary Art of Canada and Newfoundland 
 1942-45 Vancouver Art Gallery, 11th-14th Annual British Columbia Exhibitions
 1952 Vancouver Art Gallery, Annual British Columbia Exhibitions
 1957 New York, National Serigraph Society
 1959 Canadian Painter-Etchers and Engravers
 1981 Art Gallery of Hamilton, Society of Canadian Painter-Etchers, and Engravers: In Retrospect

Solo exhibitions
 1957 Moose Jaw Art Museum and National Exhibition Centre
 1967 Moose Jaw Art Museum and National Exhibition Centre, Vaughan Grayson Paintings
 1979 Moose Jaw, Paintings by Vaughan Grayson
 1980 Allie Griffin Gallery 
 1985 Kelowna Art Gallery, Ellen Vaughan Grayson: A Retrospective
 2000 Kelowna Art Gallery, Working From The Collection: Ellen Vaughan Grayson
 2002 Moose Jaw Museum and Art Gallery, Vaughan Grayson

References 

1894 births
1995 deaths
20th-century Canadian painters
20th-century Canadian writers
20th-century Canadian women writers
20th-century Canadian women artists
People from Moose Jaw
Artists from Saskatchewan
Canadian watercolourists
Canadian landscape painters
20th-century Canadian printmakers
Canadian women painters
Columbia University alumni
Canadian centenarians
Women centenarians
Women watercolorists